The following is an alphabetical list of articles related to the U.S. state of Maine.

0–9 
.me.us – Internet second-level domain for the state of Maine
2020 Maine Question 1 ballot referendum
23rd state to join the United States of America
The Original 1901 Maine Flag for the state of Maine

A

Adjacent state and provinces:  (the only state with one neighboring state)

Agriculture in Maine
Airports in Maine
Allen's Coffee Brandy, the best-selling liquor in Maine.
Amusement parks in Maine
Arboreta in Maine
commons:Category:Arboreta in Maine
Archaeology of Maine
:Category:Archaeological sites in Maine
commons:Category:Archaeological sites in Maine
Architecture of Maine
Area codes in Maine
Art museums and galleries in Maine
commons:Category:Art museums and galleries in Maine
Astronomical observatories in Maine
commons:Category:Astronomical observatories in Maine
Augusta, Maine, state capital since 1827

B
Bangor, Maine
Botanical gardens in Maine
commons:Category:Botanical gardens in Maine
Buildings and structures in Maine
commons:Category:Buildings and structures in Maine

C

Capital of the State of Maine
Capitol of the State of Maine
commons:Category:Maine State Capitol
Census statistical areas of Maine
Cities in Maine
commons:Category:Cities in Maine
Climate of Maine
Climate change in Maine 

Colleges and universities in Maine
commons:Category:Universities and colleges in Maine
Colony of Massachusetts Bay, 1628–1686 and 1689–1692
Commonwealth of Massachusetts, (1780–1820)
Communications in Maine
commons:Category:Communications in Maine
Companies in Maine
Congressional districts of Maine
Convention centers in Maine
commons:Category:Convention centers in Maine
Counties of the state of Maine
commons:Category:Counties in Maine
commons:Category:Summer camps in Maine
County seats in Maine
Culture of Maine
commons:Category:Maine culture

D
Demographics of Maine
Domestic partnership in Maine
Dominion of New-England in America, 1686–1689
Down East

E
Economy of Maine
:Category:Economy of Maine
commons:Category:Economy of Maine
Education in Maine
:Category:Education in Maine
commons:Category:Education in Maine
Elections of the state of Maine
commons:Category:Maine elections
Environment of Maine
commons:Category:Environment of Maine

F

Fauna of Maine
Festivals in Maine
commons:Category:Festivals in Maine
Flag of the state of Maine
Forts in Maine
:Category:Forts in Maine
commons:Category:Forts in Maine
French in the United States

G

Geography of Maine
:Category:Geography of Maine
commons:Category:Geography of Maine
Ghost towns in Maine
:Category:Ghost towns in Maine
commons:Category:Ghost towns in Maine
Golf clubs and courses in Maine
Government of the State of Maine  website
:Category:Government of Maine
commons:Category:Government of Maine
Governor of the State of Maine
List of governors of Maine
Great Seal of the State of Maine

H
Heritage railroads in Maine
commons:Category:Heritage railroads in Maine
High schools of Maine
Higher education in Maine
Highway routes in Maine
Hiking trails in Maine
commons:Category:Hiking trails in Maine
History of Maine
Historical outline of Maine
:Category:History of Maine
commons:Category:History of Maine
Hospitals in Maine
House of Representatives of the State of Maine

I
Île Sainte-Croix, first settlement in North America by a European nation other than Spain
Images of Maine
commons:Category:Maine
Islands of Maine

J

K

L
l'Acadie, 1604–1763
Lakes of Maine
:Category:Lakes of Maine
commons:Category:Lakes of Maine
Land patents in Maine
Landmarks in Maine
commons:Category:Landmarks in Maine
Laws of the state of Maine
Lists related to the state of Maine:
List of airports in Maine
List of census statistical areas in Maine
List of cities in Maine
List of colleges and universities in Maine
List of United States congressional districts in Maine
List of counties in Maine
List of county seats in Maine
List of dams and reservoirs in Maine
List of forts in Maine
List of ghost towns in Maine
List of governors of Maine
List of high schools in Maine
List of highway routes in Maine
List of hospitals in Maine
List of islands of Maine
List of lakes in Maine
List of land patents in Maine
List of law enforcement agencies in Maine
List of museums in Maine
List of National Historic Landmarks in Maine
List of New England towns in Maine
List of newspapers in Maine
List of painters from Maine
List of people from Maine
List of plantations in Maine
List of power stations in Maine
List of radio stations in Maine
List of railroads in Maine
List of Registered Historic Places in Maine
List of rivers of Maine
List of school districts in Maine
List of state forests in Maine
List of state parks in Maine
List of state prisons in Maine
List of symbols of the State of Maine
List of telephone area codes in Maine
List of television stations in Maine
List of towns in Maine
List of United States congressional delegations from Maine
List of United States congressional districts in Maine
List of United States representatives from Maine
List of United States senators from Maine
List of unorganized territories in Maine
List of Maine Wildlife Areas
List of wineries and vineyards in Maine

M
Maine  website
:Category:Maine
commons:Category:Maine
Maine Guide
Maine Public Employees Retirement System
Maine School Administrative District 45
Maine State House
Maine State Police
Maps of Maine
commons:Category:Maps of Maine
Mass media in Maine
ME – United States Postal Service postal code for the State of Maine
Mid Coast
Mountains of Maine
commons:Category:Mountains of Maine
Museums in Maine
:Category:Museums in Maine
commons:Category:Museums in Maine
Music of Maine
commons:Category:Music of Maine
:Category:Musical groups from Maine
:Category:Musicians from Maine

N
National Forests of Maine
commons:Category:National Forests of Maine
Natural gas pipelines in Maine
Natural history of Maine
commons:Category:Natural history of Maine
New England
New England towns in Maine
Newspapers of Maine

O

P
Painters from Maine
Pennellville Historic District
People from Maine
:Category:People from Maine
commons:Category:People from Maine
:Category:People by city in Maine
:Category:People by county in Maine
Politics of Maine
commons:Category:Politics of Maine
Portland, Maine, first state capital 1820-1827
Protected areas of Maine
commons:Category:Protected areas of Maine
Province of Massachusetts Bay, 1691–1776

Q

R
Radio stations in Maine
Railroad museums in Maine
commons:Category:Railroad museums in Maine
Railroads in Maine
Registered historic places in Maine
commons:Category:Registered Historic Places in Maine
Religion in Maine
:Category:Religion in Maine
commons:Category:Religion in Maine
Rivers of Maine
commons:Category:Rivers of Maine
Roller coasters in Maine
commons:Category:Roller coasters in Maine

S
School districts of Maine
Scouting in Maine
Senate of the State of Maine
Settlements in Maine
Cities in Maine
Towns in Maine
Census Designated Places in Maine
List of ghost towns in Maine
Ski areas and resorts in Maine
commons:Category:Ski areas and resorts in Maine
Solar power in Maine
Sports in Maine
commons:Category:Sports in Maine
Sports venues in Maine
commons:Category:Sports venues in Maine
State of Maine  website
Government of the State of Maine
:Category:Government of Maine
commons:Category:Government of Maine
Executive branch of the government of the State of Maine
Governor of the State of Maine
Legislative branch of the government of the State of Maine
Legislature of the State of Maine
Senate of the State of Maine
House of Representatives of the State of Maine
Judicial branch of the government of the State of Maine
State of Massachusetts, 1776–1780
State parks of Maine
commons:Category:State parks of Maine
State Police of Maine
State prisons of Maine
Structures in Maine
commons:Category:Buildings and structures in Maine
Symbols of the State of Maine
:Category:Symbols of Maine
commons:Category:Symbols of Maine

T
Telecommunications in Maine
commons:Category:Communications in Maine
Telephone area codes in Maine
Television shows set in Maine
Television stations in Maine
Theatres in Maine
commons:Category:Theatres in Maine
Tourism in Maine  website
commons:Category:Tourism in Maine
Towns in Maine
commons:Category:Cities in Maine
Transportation in Maine
:Category:Transportation in Maine
commons:Category:Transport in Maine

U
United States of America
States of the United States of America
United States census statistical areas of Maine
United States congressional delegations from Maine
United States congressional districts in Maine
United States Court of Appeals for the First Circuit
United States District Court for the District of Maine
United States representatives from Maine
United States senators from Maine
Universities and colleges in Maine
commons:Category:Universities and colleges in Maine
US-ME – ISO 3166-2:US region code for the State of Maine

V

W
Waterfalls in Maine
commons:Category:Waterfalls in Maine
Wikimedia
Wikimedia Commons:Category:Maine
commons:Category:Maps of Maine
Wikinews:Category:Maine
Wikinews:Portal:Maine
Wikipedia Category:Maine
Wikipedia Category:Maine wine
Wikipedia Category:Wineries in Maine
Wikipedia:WikiProject Maine
:Category:WikiProject Maine articles
:Category:WikiProject Maine members
Wildlife Management Areas (WMA)
Wind power in Maine
Wineries and vineyards in Maine

X

Y

Z

See also

Topic overview:
Maine
Outline of Maine

Maine
 
Maine